Martin Smith Ore (born 9 March 1955) is a Norwegian luger, born in Oslo. He competed at the 1976 Winter Olympics in Innsbruck, where he placed 15th in doubles together with Eilif Nedberg.

References

External links

1955 births
Living people
Sportspeople from Oslo
Norwegian male lugers
Olympic lugers of Norway
Lugers at the 1976 Winter Olympics